A bandmaster is the leader and conductor of a band, usually a military or marching band.

Bandmaster may also refer to:

Films 
 The Band Master (1917 film), a silent film
 The Bandmaster (1930 film), a Krazy Kat short
 The Bandmaster (1931 film), an Oswald the Lucky Rabbit cartoon
 Band Master, a 1993 Tamil-language film

Equipment 
 Fender Bandmaster, an amplifier made by Fender
 Fender Bandmaster Reverb, an amplifier made by Fender